WKPL may refer to:

Wickliffe Public Library, an independent library serving Wickliffe, Ohio
WKPL (FM), a radio station (92.1 FM) in Ellwood City, Pennsylvania.